Patty Sheehan (born October 27, 1956) is an American professional golfer. She became a member of the LPGA Tour in 1980 and won six major championships and 35 LPGA Tour events in all. She is a member of the World Golf Hall of Fame.

Sheehan also hosts the Patty Sheehan & Friends, which is a tournament on the Legends Tour. Patty Sheehan & Friends helps aid women and children's charities all across Northern Nevada.

Amateur career
Sheehan was born in Middlebury, Vermont. She was rated one of the top junior snow skiers in the country as a 13-year-old. She attended Earl Wooster High School in Reno, Nevada. She won three straight Nevada high school championships (1972–74), three straight Nevada State Amateurs (1975–78) and two straight California Women's Amateurs (1977–78). She was the runner-up at the 1979 U.S. Women's Amateur, then was the 1980 AIAW national individual intercollegiate golf champion. She went 4-0 as a member of the 1980 U.S. Curtis Cup team. She won the Broderick Award in 1980. She attended  University of Nevada and San Jose State University. She is a member of both the Collegiate Golf Hall of Fame and the National High School Hall of Fame.

Professional career
Sheehan turned professional and joined the LPGA Tour in 1980. She won LPGA Rookie of the Year honors in 1981 with her first professional victory coming at the Mazda Japan Classic. She was strong throughout the 1980s, winning four times in both 1983 and 1984, and winning the LPGA Championship in both seasons. She won LPGA Tour Player of the Year in 1983 and was one of several athletes named Sports Illustrated Sportsman of the Year in 1987. Sheehan suffered a loss personally in 1989, when her home and possessions were destroyed in the 1989 Loma Prieta earthquake. She also suffered a professional loss in 1990, when after holding an 11-shot lead during the third round of the U.S. Women's Open, she lost the tournament to Betsy King.

Sheehan started off the 1990s with five wins in 1990. She won the U.S. Women's Open in 1992 and 1994, the Mazda LPGA Championship in 1995, and the Nabisco Dinah Shore (now known as the Kraft Nabisco Championship) in 1996. That would be her final LPGA victory. She qualified for the LPGA Hall of Fame by winning her 30th tournament in 1993. She finished in the Top 10 on the LPGA money list every year from 1982 to 1993. While she never led, she did finish second five times in that span. When she won the U.S. Women's Open and the Women's British Open in 1992, she became the first golfer to win both in the same year.

Sheehan played on the U.S. Solheim Cup team five times (1990, 1992, 1994, 1996, 2002) and captained the team in 2002 and 2003.

Sheehan became one of the first LPGA players to publicly announce that she was a lesbian. Sheehan and her partner Rebecca Gaston have two children.

In June 2020, in honor of the 50th anniversary of the first LGBTQ Pride parade, Queerty named her among the fifty heroes "leading the nation toward equality, acceptance, and dignity for all people".

Professional wins (41)

LPGA Tour wins (35)

LPGA Tour playoff record (5–7)

LPGA majors are shown in bold.

Ladies European Tour wins (1)
1992 (1) Weetabix Women's British Open
Note: Sheehan won the Women's British Open before it became a major championship.

LPGA of Japan Tour wins (3)
1981 (1) Mazda Japan Classic1
1988 (1) Mazda Japan Classic1
1992 (1) Daikin Orchid Ladies
1Co-sanctioned by the LPGA Tour

Legends Tour wins (3)
2002 Copps Great Lakes Classic
2005 BJ's Charity Championship	(with Pat Bradley; tie with Cindy Rarick and Jan Stephenson)
2006 World Ladies Senior Open

Other wins (1)
1994 JCPenney/LPGA Skins Game

Major championships

Wins (6)

1In an 18-hole playoff, Sheehan 72, Inkster 74.

Team appearances
Amateur
Curtis Cup (representing the United States): 1980 (winners)

Professional
Solheim Cup (representing the United States): 1990 (winners), 1992, 1994 (winners), 1996 (winners), 2002 (non-playing captain, winners), 2003 (non-playing captain)
Handa Cup (representing the United States): 2006 (winners), 2007 (winners), 2008 (winners), 2009 (winners), 2010 (winners), 2011 (winners), 2012 (tie, Cup retained)

See also
List of golfers with most LPGA Tour wins
List of golfers with most LPGA major championship wins

References

External links

American female golfers
San Jose State Spartans women's golfers
LPGA Tour golfers
Winners of LPGA major golf championships
Solheim Cup competitors for the United States
World Golf Hall of Fame inductees
Golfers from Vermont
Golfers from Nevada
Lesbian sportswomen
LGBT golfers
American LGBT sportspeople
LGBT people from Nevada
LGBT people from Vermont
People from Middlebury, Vermont
Sportspeople from Reno, Nevada
1956 births
Living people